Cercle de Joachim SC is a Mauritian football club based in Curepipe. They play in the Mauritian League, the top division in Mauritian football. The club of Curepipe has won the last two titles including the first ever Mauritian professional football club. Cercle De Joachim has a great rivalry against Curepipe Starlight, the other club of Curepipe. The club is also known to have a decent fan base.

Honours
Mauritian League: 2
2014, 2015
Mauritian Republic Cup: 1
2016

Stadium
Their home stadium is Stade George V (cap. 6,200), located in Curepipe, Plaines Wilhems District. They share this stadium with Curepipe Starlight SC.

References

External links
Soccerway
Tablesleague

Curepipe
Football clubs in Mauritius